Kohinoor Sporting Club is a Malagasy football club that currently plays in  the THB Champions League the top division of Malagasy football.
The team is based in the Diana in northern Madagascar.

References

General
Soccerway

Football clubs in Madagascar